Constantini is an Italian surname. Notable people with the surname include:

Claudio Constantini, Peruvian pianist
Dietmar Constantini, Austrian footballer and manager
Eduardo Constantini, Argentine
Lilian Constantini (1902-1982), born Liliane Chapiro-Volpert, French actress in the 1920s and 1930s.
Maria-Grazzia Constantini (in marriage Lacedelli, born 1943), Italian curler
María Teresa Constantini, Argentine actress
Shlomi Constantini, Israeli neurosurgeon
François Xavier Constantini, French Cyber expert

See also
Constantine (disambiguation)

Italian-language surnames
Patronymic surnames
Surnames from given names